Exo is a South Korean-Chinese boy band produced by SM Entertainment. Separated into subgroups Exo-K and Exo-M, respectively performing music in Korean and Mandarin, the band debuted on April 8, 2012 with the single, "Mama". Prior to debut, various members of the band have modeled in music videos performed by senior SM Entertainment artists.

The band has released thirteen albums since their debut (not including repackaged albums), the EPs Mama, Miracles in December, Sing for You, Overdose, For Life, Universe and the studio albums XOXO, Exodus, Ex'Act, The War, Countdown, Don't Mess Up My Tempo, and Obsession.

Music videos

As lead artist

Video albums

DVDs

Filmography

Film

Drama

Reality shows

External links

References 

Videographies of South Korean artists
Videography